In France, career judges are considered civil servants exercising one of the sovereign powers of the state, so French citizens are eligible for judgeship, but not citizens of the other EU countries. France's independent court system enjoys special statutory protection from the executive branch. Procedures for the appointment, promotion, and removal of judges vary depending on whether it is for the ordinary ("") or administrative stream. Judicial appointments in the judicial stream must be approved by a special panel, the High Council of the Judiciary. Once appointed, career judges serve for life and cannot be removed without specific disciplinary proceedings conducted before the Council with due process.

The Ministry of Justice handles the administration of courts and the judiciary, including paying salaries or constructing new courthouses. The Ministry also funds and administers the prison system. Lastly, it receives and processes applications for presidential pardons and proposes legislation dealing with matters of civil or criminal justice. The Minister of Justice is also the head of public prosecution, though this is controversial since it is seen to represent a conflict of interest in cases such as political corruption against politicians.

At the basic level, the courts can be seen as organized into:

ordinary courts, which handle criminal and civil litigation
administrative courts, which supervise the government and handle complaints

The structure of the French judiciary is divided into three tiers:
Inferior courts of original and general jurisdiction
Intermediate appellate courts which hear cases on appeal from lower courts
Courts of last resort which hear appeals from lower appellate courts on the interpretation of law.
There are exceptions to this scheme, as noted below.

Glossary

There exist significant problems with applying non-French terminology and concepts related to law and justice to the French justice system. For this reason, a glossary has been provided to define many of the key terms used in the rest of the article.

accusateur public will supervise all the police officers of the department; in case of negligence on their part, he will warn them; in case of more serious offence, he will refer them to the criminal court, which, according to the nature of the offence, will pronounce the correctional punishment determined by the law.

Law

Procedural
While in Germanic Europe the supreme courts can and do tend to write more verbose opinions supported by legal reasoning, the typical Francophone court of cassation decision is short, concise and devoid of explanation or justification. There is no stare decisis, or principle of precedent, binding lower courts to respect superior courts' rulings (case law) on questions of law; but a line of similar case decisions, while not precedent per se, forms the jurisprudence constante.

Criminal
Public offenses are categorized as:

 , serious felonies, which are heard by the Assize Court
 , less serious felonies and misdemeanors, which are heard by the Criminal Court (also called the Correctional Court)
 , minor offenses and violations, which are heard by the Police Court (also called the Police Tribunal)

For petty misdemeanors like most traffic violations, suspected offenders may either plea nolo contendere and pay a set fine amount (amende forfaitaire) or contest the charge in court. The court may then find the defendant innocent or guilty, but if found guilty, they are liable to be sentenced a higher fine.

Organization

At the basic level, the courts can be seen as organized into:

ordinary courts, which handle criminal and civil litigation
administrative courts, which supervise the government and handle complaints

Ordinary

Minor jurisdiction
At the bottom of the court hierarchy are the courts of minor jurisdiction. The Police Court (also called the Police Tribunal) hears , minor criminal offenses such as traffic violations, minor assaults, and breaches of the peace. The Civil Court hears minor civil cases.

Major jurisdiction
The next tier are the courts of major jurisdiction. When the court hears , less serious felonies and misdemeanors, it is called a Criminal Court (also called a Correctional Court). When the court sits to hear civil matters, it is called a Civil Court (also called a Grand Instance Court). It has general jurisdiction for civil matters over 10 000 €. The court also sits as a Juvenile Court.

The courts are normally composed of 3 judges, but some offenses such as traffic offenses, soft drugs, and misuse of credit cards and checking accounts may be heard by 1 judge.

Specialized jurisdiction
The Labour Court (France) (conseil de prud'hommes) hears disputes and suits between employers and employees (apart from cases devoted to administrative courts); the court is said to be  because it is composed of equal numbers of representatives from employer unions, e.g., MEDEF and CGPME, and employee unions. The Agricultural Land Tribunal hears cases dealing with long-term leases for farm land estates. The Social security tribunal hears suits over welfare and state benefits. The Business Court (tribunal de commerce) hears matters involving trade and business disputes and the panel is elected from the local business community.

Court of Assize
As a court of first instance, it is normally composed of 3 judges and 6 (formerly 9) jurors, but in some cases (involving for instance terrorism or illegal drug trade) the court may sit as 5 judges alone. When it sits as a court of appeal, it is composed of 3 judges and 9 (formerly 12) jurors, or 7 judges alone.

Court of Appeal
The Court of Appeal handles appeals from most lower courts. It is composed of 3 judges. The Court is divided into a number of divisions or courts: social security, business, general civil, and criminal. Formerly, it required the intervention of a solicitor or case attorney (avoué) to prepare and manage the case and to act as an intermediary between the barrister and the appellant or appellee; the functions of the avoué were abolished in 2012. Appeals may take anywhere from 18 to 24 months, if not longer.

Court of Cassation
The Court of Cassation is the highest level of appeal in France. These courts sit in six chambers with fifteen judges in each; however, only seven judges need to be present to hear a case. There are more than 120 judges serving in the court.

The Court of Cassation hears appeals from the assize courts and the courts of appeal. Criminal cases are heard in only one of the court's five chambers and the court has no legal authority to deny a criminal appeal. The Court is referred to as the guardian of the law. It only reviews questions of law, not questions of fact.  The Court’s essential purpose is to ensure that the interpretation of the law is uniform throughout the country.

The Court is located in the Hall of Justice building in Paris. It was established in 1790 under the name  during the French Revolution, and its original purpose was to act as a court of error with revisionary jurisdiction over lower provincial prerogative courts. However, much about the Court continues the earlier Paris Parliament Court.

Administrative

Administrative courts of general jurisdiction

Administrative court

Appellate administrative court

Council of State

Financial courts
The financial courts - national Court of Audit (cour des comptes) and regional audit courts (chambres régionales des comptes) - have jurisdiction to try cases involving possible misuse of public funds, and, in some rare instances, of private funds.

They are empowered and mandated by Article 15 of the 1789 Declaration of the Rights of Man and of the Citizen which set forth that French citizens have the right to hold public officers, agents, and officials accountable for the finances they oversee and operate. The courts' roles and responsibilities are laid out in the Financial Court Code.

Jurisdictional court
The Jurisdictional Court, or tribunal des conflits, handles conflicts between the civil system of justice and the administrative system of justice. There are two kinds of conflicts:
Positive conflict: both systems consider themselves competent for the same case.
Negative conflict: both systems consider that the other system is competent for the case, resulting in a denial of justice.
In both cases, the tribunal des conflits will render final judgment on which system is competent.

Constitutional Council

The Constitutional Council practices judicial review of legislative acts and laws. The ordinary and administrative courts have refused to perform this type of judicial review, outside of 2 exceptions in 1851. It supervises controversies of elections and performs judicial review by determining the constitutionality of parliamentary legislation.

Jurisdiction
The Court of Audit and regional audit courts mostly adjudicate cases regarding public funds, carrying out:
Mandatory audits of public accountants to track national and local government funds.
Discretionary audits of public corporations, publicly subsidized private organizations, and social security and welfare agencies.
Since 1999, audits of private charities who regularly receive public donations.
Neither national or regional audit courts hear cases related to private organizations, with the few exceptions noted here. Instead, financial cases concerning private funds and money fall within the jurisdiction of the civil justice system.

Prior to 1982, France only had a single national Court of Audit. With a push toward decentralization in the creation of province-like administrative regions and the increased role of local elected officials and considering the Court's enormous docket, France saw fit to establish regional audit courts. The national court now deals primarily with the government, public establishments, and (semi-)public companies on a national level, while the regional courts handle the local level. The court may occasionally delegate national-level audits to regional courts, as is often the case with post-secondary educational facilities.

An important concept in the business of the financial courts is the difference between, in French public accountings, between ordonnateurs (managers who order expenses and perception of payments) and payeurs (the public accountants who pay expenses and recoup debts). The Court only judges public accountants; but it may also make observations about the decisions taken by the ordonnateurs, and possibly send them before other courts for mismanagement (see below).

Activities
These jurisdictions act as courts in the ordinary sense of the word in
some limited circumstances. That is, they judge the accounting of
public accountants (comptables publics) and may fine them in case
of certain failures:
They may fine public accountants if they are late in handing over their accounting.
They may find that the accountant neglected to collect money owed to the state (or other government) or, through negligence, unduly gave away state (or other government) money. The responsibility of the public accountant in those circumstances is personal and unlimited, meaning that he or she has to refund all lost money. This situation is known as débet (from Latin: "he owes"). Because of the possibility of débet, all public accountants must have external warranty as well as insurance. In practice, many débets grossly exceed the financial means of the public accountants concerned, and the Minister of Finance may end up pardoning the debt (remise gracieuse).
They may find that somebody or some organization did accounting operations on public funds whereas they were not public accountants. In those circumstances, they are found to be de facto public accountants (comptables de fait) and they face the same constraints and penalties as de jure public accountants.

In addition, the Cour des Comptes supports and provides half of the judges of the Cour de discipline financière et budgétaire (Court of financial and budgetary discipline), the other half being provided by the Conseil d'État. This court tries ordonnateurs — that is, the persons who order expenses and the recovery of debts, and may fine them for undue expenses or for sums that they should have decided to recover. However, the court cannot try government ministers, or (in almost all cases), local elected officials; thus, with few exceptions, the only ordonnateurs that face the court are civil servants.

If the Cour des Comptes or the regional chambers discern criminal behavior in the accounts that they audit, they refer the matter to the appropriate criminal court.

Most of the activity of the Cour des Comptes and the regional chambers is not of a judicial kind (juridictionnel); rather, they act as a general auditing system. However, even for these activities, they act with almost complete independence of both the executive and the legislative branches.

The court and chambers may advise, or reprimand, ministries, administrations and public establishments that they audited.

The court and chamber publish a yearly report in which it discusses a selection of misuses of funds and other incidents. In addition, they may also publish specialized reports. The court and chambers are free to inquire on whatever they wish within their field of competency; the court may also be commissioned reports by Parliament.

In all these advisory and publishing activities, the court and chambers do not limit themselves to pure accounting issues, but they also take the efficiency of public services into account. They may, for instance, criticize an expense that was legally ordered and accounted for, but which was inappropriate with respect to criteria of good financial management.

The 2001 Loi d'orientation sur les lois de finances (LOLF, law fixing the framework for budget acts) changed the way budget was passed in France: now, budget is attributed to specific missions, and the efficiency of spending on each mission is to be assessed. In that context, the court's missions will include an increased dose of assessment of efficiency.

Bibliography
Code de procédure civile
Code de procédure pénale
Documentation française
Code de justice administrative
Code des juridictions financières
La Cour des Comptes (booklet published by the Cour)
Serge Guinchard, André Varinard and Thierry Debard, Institutions juridictionnelles (= Judicials institutions),  Paris, Dalloz editor, 12th edition, 2013.
Serge Guinchard and Jacques Buisson, Criminal procedural law, Paris, Lexisnexis editor, 9th edition, 2013.
Serge Guinchard, Cécile Chainais and Frédérique Ferrand, Civil procedure, Paris, Dalloz editor, 31st edition, 2012 .
Serge Guinchard and alii, Procedural law, Paris, Dalloz editor, 7th edition, January 2013.

See also
Law enforcement in France
Tribunal d'instance
Court of Cassation (France)
Cour d'assises
Constitutional Council of France

Notes

References

External links
Quick description of the French court system 
The French legal system
Ordinary courts - France
Specialised courts - France